The York Knights are the men's professional rugby league team of York RLFC (known as the York City Knights from 2002 to 2022) based in York, England. The Knights played their home games at Huntington Stadium before moving to Bootham Crescent. In 2021, they moved to the newly built York Community Stadium. the previous site of Huntington stadium, where they ground share with the York RLFC women's team York Valkyrie and York City F.C. In the 2016 season they played in League 1. In 2018 the club succeeded in winning all their matches except two and were crowned league champions, earning immediate promotion to the Championship league. The current club was formed in 2002 after the original York club folded.

History

1868–2002: Predecessor

The first club was formed in 1868 as "York Football Club", playing both codes, association and rugby football in different fields as the club did not have their own venue.

When Northern rugby teams broke away from the Rugby Football Union to form their own Northern Union in 1895, York initially stayed with the RFU but in 1901 they joined the new entity.

The original York Wasps folded in March 2002. After a last-ditch take-over deal to save the Wasps collapsed, the RFL accepted the club's resignation on 26 March 2002.

2002–2003: New club 
A supporters' trust working party was formed on 27 March and applied to the RFL to continue the 2002 Northern Ford Premiership fixtures. After hearing it would be impossible to meet requirements to return that season, on 5 May fans backed a proposal for a new club to apply for admittance to the league for 2003.

The RFL accepted York's bid to play in the newly formed National League Two on condition that they had £75,000 in the bank by 31 August. The new club decided that the best way to raise cash was through a fans' membership scheme. Former Great Britain star Paul Broadbent was revealed as player-coach. With the total standing at £70,000, John Smith's brewery came in with £5,000 as the club hit the target just hours before the deadline.

The full name of the new club was revealed to be York City Knights RLFC, following a competition in The Evening Press. Club bosses, in the following month of October, also let the public design a club logo which was based on the New South Wales Rugby League Team's logo, while they picked new colours of blue and white – a move away from York RL's traditional amber and black. John Guildford, majority shareholder of York building firm Guildford Construction, was revealed to be the majority shareholder. They played at Huntington Stadium, where the previous incarnation of York RL played.

2003–2006: National League 2 and promotion
The Knights played their first game at home against Hull Kingston Rovers in the National League Cup on 19 January with a bumper crowd of 3,105. In their first year, the Knights finished fourth with 11 wins, a draw and 6 losses. They made the National League Two play-offs but lost 50–30 to Barrow Raiders. Paul Broadbent resigned as coach at the end of the season.

Richard Agar was appointed head coach for the following year. They made it all the way to the Challenge Cup Quarter Final, losing 50–12 to Huddersfield Giants. York also made the semi finals of the Championship Cup, losing 32–0 to Hull Kingston Rovers. After finishing second in the league, and three points behind Barrow, the Knights entered the playoffs. They lost 37–20 in the qualifying semi final to Halifax and then beat Workington Town 70–10. Mark Cain broke the record for most tries in a match and the score was the highest points tally since the Knights were born. They were narrowly beaten in the play-off final by Halifax 34–30 at the Halton Stadium in Widnes. Agar left York to join Hull F.C. as an assistant coach.

York appointed Mick Cook as their new head coach in 2005 as part of a partnership with Super League club Leeds Rhinos. Cook's side made it to the 5th Round of the Challenge Cup losing 62–0 to St. Helens 62–0 at Knowsley Road. At the end of the league season they were champions by three points and were promoted automatically to National League One for the first time. They were now only one tier away from Super League. They had the highest crowd average for National League One teams, of 1,986. York's game against Hunslet on 25 May 2005 drew a crowd of 3,224 which at the time was a record for National League One.

York kicked off their first season in rugby league's second tier, losing 25–18 away at Widnes Vikings. They lost their first seven games before finally beating Oldham 62–0 and then again 15 days later, 54–10. Despite a good late run of form including wins over Whitehaven, Doncaster and Rochdale Hornets, York were relegated back to National League Two at the end of the season culminating in a 60–16 defeat to Leigh Centurions at Hilton Park. York finished second bottom, above Oldham with five wins and thirteen defeats, three points below Doncaster. They did however, win the Fairfax Cup, after beating Batley 14–10 in their first appearance in the York International 9s.

2007–2010: Relegation to Championship 1

2007 was a poor season for the City Knights, finishing sixth in the league with ten wins and twelve losses. There was also a record defeat for York City Knights in the Challenge Cup 5th Round losing 74–4 to Huddersfield Giants, Chris Spurr getting York's sole try. Mick Cook quit as coach at the end of the season to run his business and Paul March was appointed player-coach on a one-year rolling contract in September 2007.

He took York to sixth place again with eleven wins and ten losses. Even though there were three promotion places available (two automatic, one via the playoffs), the Knights failed to capitalise and lost in the playoffs to Rochdale Hornets 12–28. Gateshead Thunder and Barrow Raiders went up automatically, Doncaster went up via the playoffs.

2009 saw the Knights start positively and looked like they could challenge for the title. After a Sky Sports game at home to Oldham, March was sacked in due to disciplinary matters and then director of rugby James Ratcliffe took over. The Knights finished third but eventually lost in the playoffs in the semi final to Oldham 44–14.

Chris Thorman arrived at the club in 2010 as assistant to Ratcliffe but saw himself become acting head coach while Ratcliffe was suspended. The Knights claimed one of their biggest scalps when they defeated Leigh Centurions, who were in the division above, 13–12 in the Northern Rail Cup group stages thanks to a late Thorman drop goal. Ratcliffe returned for the away game at Doncaster and Dave Woods arrived at York as director of rugby in April 2010. Five games later, Ratcliffe was sacked after a 30–36 defeat to Swinton Lions and Woods was named as head coach. York were fifth in Championship 1 at the time after seven wins and six losses in the league. Woods' first game was a 60–12 victory over Gateshead and finished third in the table and thus qualified for the play-offs. After losing to Oldham, York then beat Blackpool Panthers in the semi final where they'd face Oldham in the final. On 26 September 2010, the Knights won the Co-operative Championship 1 play-off Grand Final to earn promotion to the Championship. They beat Oldham 25–6 at the Halliwell Jones Stadium in Warrington. The Knights had finished the regular season 13 points behind their final opponents.

2011–2013: Promotion to the Championship

York finished third-bottom of the Championship in 2011, but bottom club Toulouse were exempt from relegation so, with two going down, the Knights faced demotion along with Dewsbury Rams – until the RFL decided not to admit Crusaders into this division following their withdrawal from Super League, thus earning York a reprieve. Dewsbury were also saved after Barrow Raiders received a points deduction meaning the Knights finished fourth bottom. Just six days later Dave Woods was sacked by the club.

In 2012, there were no relegation spots available and thus, York decided against strengthening their squad. Chris Thorman was appointed head coach and former Leeds Rhinos full back Jordan Tansey signed for the club on a one-year deal. York won one league game all season beating Swinton Lions 26–22. Thus York finished bottom of the pile. Chris Thorman announced he would be joining the coaching staff at Huddersfield Giants at the end of the season. He was to be replaced by Gary Thornton who was appointed head coach in 2012 .

2013 started off well for the City Knights and looked to be challenging for the playoffs. A run of eleven straight losses at the end of the season and failure to win away in the league since June 2011 saw them relegated back to Rugby Leagues basement tier. They made the 5th round of the Challenge Cup losing 92–8 away at Catalans Dragons. The Knights finished the season seven points from safety with six wins and twenty losses.

2014–2016: League 1

York City Knights played in Championship 1, as they finished bottom of the Championship in the 2013 season. Famous wins in 2014 came against Hunslet whom they beat three time, 28–26 away in March, 40–0 at home in May and won the league at the South Leeds Stadium after the comeback was sealed thanks to a Colton Roche Try meaning the Knights won 20–18. They also beat Oldham 54–14 at home. York City Knights topped Championship 1 but lost in the end of season play-offs to Hunslet Hawks, thus failing to secure promotion back the Championship.

Gary Thornton was sacked and was replaced by James Ford for the start of the 2015 season where the Knights are now homeless after John Guildford failed to sign up for the Community Stadium deal. John Guildford has stepped down as Chairman and appointed four directors; Stephen Knowles, Dave Baldwin, Neil Jennings and Gary Dickenson, the latter has since stepped down.

On 18 June 2015, York City Knights reserves were kicked out of the reserve league and banned from entering the 2016 competition. The first team still remained homeless.

At the end of the 2015 season, York City Knights finished Fourth in League 1 and qualified for the playoffs. They lost out to Swinton Lions 17–16 on the Golden Point They were also knocked out in the League 1 Cup second round by Newcastle Thunder. They reached the fifth round of the Challenge Cup, losing to St. Helens 46–6.

Closure threat

In July 2016 it was announced the club would not be able to play their first game of the Super 8s against Doncaster at Bootham Crescent due to York City FC playing on the Saturday, meaning that the Knights would have to play midweek due to there having to be 24 hours between games at the stadium. Due to the disputes between the owner and the council, the club directors announced that they would be winding up the club as soon as all necessary legal steps had been taken.  The following day a joint statement from the club, the RFL and the city council was issued stating "We continue to work to resolve this situation and are hopeful that ways can be found for James Ford and his players to be able to fulfil the remainder of their fixtures this season."
On 25 July the club owner, John Guildford, announced that he was in negotiation with local businessman, Gary Dickenson, and that the sale would be of a club "virtually debt-free" enabling the Knights to continue to run. however on 23 August Dickenson discontinued the negotiations.  Following the collapse of the sale to Dickenson, Guildford put the club up for sale to any interested buyer.

The RFL issued a deadline of 1 December 2016 for ownership issues to be resolved and late on 1 December the club issued a statement that ownership of the Knights had passed entirely to a consortium headed by Jon Flatman.  The following day the RFL confirmed that the team would be re-instated into League 1 for the 2017 season. In January 2017, it was revealed that the club will play all home fixtures in 2017 and 2018 at York City's Bootham Crescent, and that the team colours had changed to amber and black.

In April 2018, the club broke two 24 year old world records for rugby league when they beat West Wales Raiders 144–0, beating the previous highest score of 142–4 (Huddersfield Giants v Blackpool Gladiators, November 1994) and the previous record margin of 138 points (Barrow Raiders v Nottingham City, 138–0, also November 1994).
At the end of the 2018 season, York were promoted back to the RFL Championship.

Back in the Championship
York finished the 2021 RFL Championship season in 9th place. The following year, the club reached the playoffs by finishing sixth. However, a month before the playoffs began on the 21 August 2022, York suffered a club record 100-4 loss against Leigh. In the playoffs, York upset Halifax in the first week to set up another match against Leigh. On this occasion, York were defeated 70-10 which ended their season.

Stadiums

2002–2014: Huntington Stadium

The Knights played their first game at Huntington Stadium on 19 January 2003. It had previously been the home ground of York Wasps until they were dissolved in 2002.  The capacity was 3,428 and the stadium also had an athletics track. The Knights left the stadium at the end of the 2014 season and it was later demolished to allow for the building of York Community Stadium which is on the same site.

2015: Elm Park Way
The Knights were left homeless and were forced to ground share with local amateur team Heworth A.R.L.F.C. for a season until they could find a permanent home.

2016–2020: Bootham Crescent

In 2016 the Knights began ground sharing with York City F.C. at Bootham Crescent. The Crescent had a capacity of 8,256 with 3,409 seats and the remaining capacity was standing.

2021: York Community Stadium

In March 2021 the knights played their first match at York Community Stadium in a pre-season game against Hull F.C. The stadium has a capacity of 8,500.

Club identity and colours
In 2002, following the demise of York Wasps, the newly established York club sought a new beginning with a new identity that left behind the difficulties associated with the previous club. The team adopted a blue and white kit rather than the traditional amber and black colours and competitions were held in the local newspaper, The Evening Press, first to choose a new name, York City Knights RLFC, and then to design a club logo. A club mascot, Norris the Knight, was introduced making his first public appearance in December 2003 and taking part in the Mascot Grand National in 2006.

In the 2016 season, with the Knights sharing a ground with York City F.C., they launched an away kit in blue and red; the colours of the football club and proposed colour scheme of the future community stadium. However, the club changed ownership in December 2016 and the following month it was announced that both the home and away kits would change to the amber and black historically associated with rugby league in York, and which had previously been used for heritage and away kits. The club badge initially remained blue and white, but this too would change colour the following year when the 2018 kit launched featuring a new logo that commemorated the 150th anniversary of the original York club.

On 14 October 2022, the club announced that it had changed its name to York RLFC as an umbrella term with the men's team continued to be known as the Knights. The women's team became the Valkyrie. Both teams introduced new logos as part of the rebrand.

Kit sponsors and manufacturers

2023 squad

2023 transfers

Gains

Losses

Staff

Coaching register

 Paul Broadbent 2003
 Richard Agar 2004
 Mick Cook 2005–07
 Paul March 2008–09
 James Ratcliffe 2009–10
 Dave Woods 2010–11
 Chris Thorman 2012
 Gary Thornton 2013–14
 James Ford 2015–22
 Andrew Henderson 2023–

Seasons

League history

List of seasons

Honours
League
Division 2 / Championship:
Winners (1): 1980–81
Runners up (1): 1973–74
Division 3 / League 1:
Winners (2): 2005, 2018
Runners up (2): 1998, 2004
League Leaders (2): 2014, 2018
League 1 Play Off Final Winners:
Winners (1): 2010

Cups
Challenge Cup:
Runners up (1): 1931
RFL 1895 Cup:
Runners up (1): 2021
League 1 Cup:
Runners up (1): 2016
RFL Yorkshire Cup:
Winners (3): 1922–23, 1933–34, 1936–37

Records

Individual scoring records
Goals: 20: Chris Thorman at home to Northumbria University, 6 March 2011
Tries: 7:
Kieren Moss v.  West Wales 29 April 2018
Points: 56: Chris Thorman at home to Northumbria University, 6 March 2011 – 4 tries and 20 goals
Try scoring streak 10: Jack Lee
Goals in a season: 178: (174 goals and 4 drop goals) by Danny Brough, 2004
Points in a season: 412: Danny Brough, 2004

Team records
Biggest win:
144-0 v.  West Wales (at Bootham Crescent, 29 April 2018)
Biggest defeat:
100-4 v.  Leigh (at Leigh Sports Village, 21 August 2022)

Attendance records
4,221 v.  Bradford (at Bootham Crescent, 18 February 2018)

Notes

References

External links 

 
 Official York City Knights Fans Forum

York City Knights
2002 establishments in England
English rugby league teams
Rugby clubs established in 2002
Sport in York